Second Nature is the fourth studio album by Belgian producer Netsky, released through Hospital Records on 30 October 2020. The album marks Netsky's return to Hospital Records, and includes collaborations with Becky Hill, Rudimental and Sub Focus. Second Nature debuted in the top 10 of the Flemish albums chart, and also reached the top 20 in New Zealand.

Music
Along with Netsky's signature drum and bass sound, the album also incorporates elements of other genres. Dancing Astronaut pointed to the "hip-hop hybrid" of "Blend", the influence of hardstyle on "Look at Me Go" and "disco energy" of "Don't Care What People Say".

Artwork
Netsky chose the artwork, a photograph taken of him, his father and his dog on a mountain "somewhere in southern France when [he] was seven or eight", due to being heavily influenced by listening to his father's collection of soul music records when he was growing up. Netsky said he wanted "to grasp that feeling again" on the album, although he acknowledged that the influence of soul is "definitely not all over the record. Maybe 40 or 50% is really soulful and has winks to soul music, but the other half is very dance floor".

Track listing

Charts

Weekly charts

Year-end charts

References

2020 albums
Hospital Records albums
Netsky (musician) albums